Acrelândia is a municipality located in the easternmost portion of the Brazilian state of Acre. Its population is 15,490 and its area is 1,808 km², which makes it the smallest municipality in that state.

Municipalities in Acre (state)
Populated places established in 1992